Eduardo Oropeza (1937 – September 11, 2003) is a contemporary artist.

A native of California's Silicon Valley and longtime resident of east Los Angeles, Oropeza began his academic training with Social Studies. After taking an art course, he ultimately changed major and received a Master of Fine Arts degree in sculpture from San Jose State. He follows this with postgraduate work at San Jose, San Diego State at Long Beach and Palomar College.

Sculptor, painter, printmaker, & photographer, Eduardo Oropeza remains a commanding presence in contemporary art. He applied a high level of devotion and integrity to his artwork. After the many years he had been working at his chosen profession, he saw being an artist as a tremendous gift, which honored and humbled him. A native of California's San Joaquin Valley and long time resident of East Los Angeles, Oropeza's academic training began with the study of Sociology. After taking an art course, he ultimately changed majors and received a Master of Fine Arts degree in sculpture from San Jose State. Postgraduate work followed at San Jose, San Diego State at Long Beach and Palomar College.

Oropeza’s contribution to public art in Los Angeles can be seen in a ceramic mosaic covering the 2 story Self Help Graphics Workshop building located at Ceasar Chavez and Gage streets in East Los Angeles. Oropeza donated his time and artistic talent to complete this multi-year project. The second phase of this project was the creation of a Virgin of Guadalupe shrine, shown here, for the community.

Selected exhibitions

2020 Glenn Green Galleries, Sculpture Garden, Santa Fe, New Mexico
2020 Scottsdale's Museum of the West, Scottsdale, Arizona
2017 Day of the Dead: Tilica y Flaca es la Calaca, National Museum of Mexican Art, Chicago, Illinois
2016 Estampas de la Raza: Contemporary Prints from the Romo Collection, National Museum of Mexican Art, Chicago, Illinois
2012 Estampas de la Raza: Contemporary Prints from the Romo Collection, McNay Art Museum San Antonio, Texas

2009 Outsiders Within, Tempe Center for the Arts, Tempe, Arizona
2008 Nobel Bandidas y Bold Caballeros, Autry National Center of Art, Los Angeles, California
2005     Arizona State University, Tempe, Arizona
2004 Glenn Green Galleries, Santa Fe, New Mexico
2000 Glenn Green Galleries, The Phoenician, Scottsdale, Arizona
1998 Dos de East Los, Glenn Green Galleries, Santa Fe, New Mexico
1996     Mexican Fine Arts Center Museum, Chicago, Illinois
1994 Amerika Haus, Berlin, Germany
1988 Galeria Otra Vez, Los Angeles, California Galeria Sin Frontera, Austin, Texas
1986     University of California, Los Angeles, California Images, Los Angeles, California Centro Cultural, Tijuana, MEXICORaza Gallery, San Diego, California
1985 Los Angeles Municipal Art Gallery, Los Angeles, CaliforniaTriangle Gallery, San Francisco, California Otis Art Institute, Los Angeles, CaliforniaTransamerica Gallery, Los Angeles, California Exposition Park, Los Angeles, California Galeria de Ia Palacio, Mexico City, MEXICO
1984 Los Angeles Center for Photography, Los Angeles, California Cityscape Gallery, Pasadena, California

Selected collections
LACMA Los Angeles County Museum of Art
McNay Museum of Art
Hispanic Research Center, Arizona State University
City of Sacramento, California
Mary Tyler Moore
Eartha Kitt 
Juanita Jordan 
BET Television
St. Regis Hotel, San Francisco

References

External links
https://glenngreengalleries.com/oropeza
https://collections.lacma.org/node/166968
https://collections.lacma.org/node/186808
https://latimesblogs.latimes.com/culturemonster/2008/11/bold-caballeros.html
https://collection.mcnayart.org/objects?query=oropeza
www.tempe.gov exhibitions
 mati.eas.asu.edu Artist biography
*https://www.laconservancy.org/locations/self-help-graphics-art-building-brooklyn-state-bank
 Ceramic Mural Project for Atlantis Health Management in East Los Angeles,Ca.
 https://collection.mcnayart.org/objects?query=oropeza

1937 births
2003 deaths
20th-century American sculptors
20th-century American male artists
American male sculptors